Ronald Rowan "Ron" Miller (28 August 1929 – 18 April 2010) was a Canadian athlete. He competed in the men's pole vault at the 1952 Summer Olympics.

References

1929 births
2010 deaths
Athletes (track and field) at the 1952 Summer Olympics
Canadian male pole vaulters
Olympic track and field athletes of Canada
Place of birth missing
Commonwealth Games medallists in athletics
Commonwealth Games silver medallists for Canada
Athletes (track and field) at the 1950 British Empire Games
Athletes (track and field) at the 1954 British Empire and Commonwealth Games
20th-century Canadian people
21st-century Canadian people
Medallists at the 1954 British Empire and Commonwealth Games